Several Canadian naval units have carried the name HMCS Champlain:

 , a S-class destroyer that served in the Royal Canadian Navy from 1928-1936.  Formerly  that served the Royal Navy from 1919-1928.
 HMCS Champlain, a Canadian Forces Naval Reserve division based in Chicoutimi, Quebec since its activation in 1985.

Ships of the Royal Canadian Navy
Royal Canadian Navy ship names
Military units and formations of Canada in World War II